Kozu or Kōzu may refer to:

Places 
 Kōzu-shima (神津島), or Kozu Island, an island south of Tokyo Bay
 Kōzu (国府津),  a place name in the eastern region of Odawara, Kanagawa
 Kōzu Station (Kanagawa), a railway station in Odawara, Kanagawa
 Kōzu (高津), a place name in Chūō-ku, Osaka
 Kōzu Station (Osaka) (郡津駅), a train station located in Katano, Osaka Prefecture

People with the name 
 Kozu Akutsu (born 1960), retired long-distance runner from Japan
, Japanese painter
 Masaaki Kozu (born 1974), Japanese cross-country skier who has competed since 1993

Japanese-language surnames